Sarwan Singh (born between 1927 and 1929) is a former Indian athlete who competed in the 110 metres hurdles. He won a gold medal at the 1954 Asian Games in Manila in the event.

Singh is also credited for having discovered the athlete Paan Singh Tomar, during his time as a Naik in the Bengal Engineer Group. Upon retiring from service in 1970, he drove taxi for nearly two decades.

Achievements

References
Notes

Citations

Living people
1920s births
Year of birth uncertain
Indian male hurdlers
Athletes from Punjab, India
Asian Games gold medalists for India
Asian Games medalists in athletics (track and field)
Athletes (track and field) at the 1954 Asian Games
Medalists at the 1954 Asian Games